Jesse White (born Jesse Marc Weidenfeld; January 3, 1917 – January 9, 1997) was an American actor, who was best known for his portrayal as "Ol' Lonely" the repairman in Maytag television commercials from 1967 to 1988.

Life and career
White was born in Buffalo, New York, and was raised in Akron, Ohio, to Jewish parents. He made his first amateur appearance in local stage productions at the age of 15.  Though aspiring to be an actor, he worked at many different jobs during the 1930s, including selling beauty supplies and lingerie. After moving to Cleveland, Ohio, White began a career in vaudeville and burlesque, traveling widely before landing a role on Broadway. In 1942, White made his Broadway debut in The Moon Is Down, followed by a successful performance in the role of a sanitarium orderly in the popular play Harvey. He later reprised his role in the 1950 film version and the 1972 television movie.

In 1947, White made his film debut in a small part in Kiss of Death. During the 1950s, he began landing roles on television shows, including appearances in Danny Thomas's Make Room for Daddy and Peter Lawford's Dear Phoebe. In 1954, he landed a semi-regular role as Cagey Calhoun on Private Secretary, starring Ann Sothern. The role led to another semi-regular part as the deceitful Oscar Pudney on CBS's The Ann Sothern Show in 1960. In 1955, he played Colonel Willoughby Oglethorpe on The Lone Ranger (season 4 episode 35).

White guest-starred on Four Star Playhouse and NBC's The Bob Cummings Show. He appeared in roles in The Bad Seed (1956); Designing Woman (1957), with Lauren Bacall; CBS's Mr. Adams and Eve (1958), with Ida Lupino and Howard Duff; and Marjorie Morningstar (1958), with Natalie Wood and Gene Kelly.

On October 2, 1958, White portrayed the fast-talking, presumably dishonest, used-car salesman San Fernando Harry in the segment "The New Car" of the ABC sitcom The Real McCoys, starring Walter Brennan.

From 1958 to 1965, White made five guest appearances on Perry Mason. In his first appearance, he played murderer Luke Hickey in "The Case of the Married Moonlighter." His second appearance was a bartender Cecil in "The case of the Melancholy Marksman". His third appearance featured him as murder victim Burt Renshaw in "The Case of the Polka Dot Pony." His fourth appearance was Tony Cerro in "The Case of the Gambling Lady". In his final appearance, he played murder victim Max Armstead in "The Case of the Fatal Fortune."

In the 1960s, White appeared on Tightrope, Oh! Those Bells, The Twilight Zone, The Dick Van Dyke Show; The Donna Reed Show; The Andy Griffith Show, The Roaring 20s, Mickey, The Beverly Hillbillies, Petticoat Junction,The Munsters, The Addams Family, That Girl, and I Dream of Jeannie. In a memorable cameo, he played a frustrated airport tower controller in Stanley Kramer's It's a Mad, Mad, Mad, Mad World (1963). In 1966, he accepted the role of Donelli in The Reluctant Astronaut, playing a curmudgeonly janitorial supervisor.

An advertising director who saw his performance on the film's release soon cast him in a television advertising campaign for the Maytag Corporation. White played the role of a lonely Maytag repairman, a man with nothing to do as a result of his company's dependable products. The campaign proved wildly successful, and the actor began a long-running and highly paid career as the ever-lonely Maytag repairman.

White continued appearing in both television and films during his many years as the Maytag repairman. His final film role was a small but pivotal role in the 1993 Joe Dante comedy Matinee starring John Goodman, and his last TV role was in "The Cadillac", an episode of Seinfeld in 1996. Seinfeld co-creator/star Jerry Seinfeld, who co-wrote the episode, had been a fan of White since his appearances on The Ann Sothern Show, and described having him on Seinfeld as a boyhood dream come true.

White was one of the voiceover actors for Stan Freberg Presents The United States of America: Volume One The Early Years, and 35 years later, he was featured on The Middle Years of the series. In addition to film and television work, White lent his voice to such cartoons as Jonny Quest and Garfield and Friends.

Personal life
In 1942, White married Celia Cohn (July 17, 1914 – August 5, 2003). The couple had two daughters, Carole Ita White (who later became an actress) and Janet Jonas.

Death
On January 9, 1997, White died from a heart attack following surgery, six days after his 80th birthday. He is interred at Mount Sinai Memorial Park Cemetery in Los Angeles.

Filmography

Film

 Stage Door Canteen (1943) as Jesse White (uncredited)
 Kiss of Death (1947) as Taxi Driver (uncredited)
 Gentleman's Agreement (1947) as Elevator Starter (uncredited)
 Texas, Brooklyn and Heaven (1948) as Customer (uncredited)
 Guilty Bystander (1950) as Masher
 Harvey (1950) as Marvin Wilson
 Katie Did It (1951) as Jim Dilloway
 Bedtime for Bonzo (1951) as Babcock
 Francis Goes to the Races (1951) as Frank Damer
 Callaway Went Thataway (1951) as Georgie Markham
 Death of a Salesman (1951) as Stanley
 The Girl in White (1952) as Alec, Ambulance Driver
 Million Dollar Mermaid (1952) as Doc Cronnol
 Gunsmoke,  aka Roughshod, A Man's Country (1953) as Professor
 Champ for a Day (1953) as Willie Foltis
 Forever Female (1953) as Willie Wolfe
 Witness to Murder (1954) as Tubby Otis
 Hell's Half Acre (1954) as Eddie Vincent
 Not as a Stranger (1955) as Ben Cosgrove
 The Girl Rush (1955) as Ludwig - Pit Boss
 The Come On (1956) as J.J. McGonigle
 He Laughed Last (1956) as Max Lassiter
 Back from Eternity (1956) as Pete Boswick
 The Bad Seed (1956) as Emory Wages
 Designing Woman (1957) as Charlie Arneg
 God Is My Partner (1957) as Louis 'The Lump' Lumpkin
 Johnny Trouble (1957) as Parsons
 Country Music Holiday (1958) as Sonny Moon
 Marjorie Morningstar (1958) as Lou Michaelson
 The Rise and Fall of Legs Diamond (1960) as Leo "Butcher" Bremer
 The Big Night (1960) as Wegg
 Three Blondes in His Life (1961) as Ed Kelly
 A Fever in the Blood (1961) as Police Sgt. Michael 'Mickey' Beers
 The Right Approach (1961) as Brian Freer
 Tomboy and the Champ (1961) as Windy Skiles
 On the Double (1961) as Corporal Joseph Praeger
 Sail a Crooked Ship (1961) as McDonald
 Period of Adjustment (1962) as Christmas Caroler (uncredited)
 It's Only Money (1962) as Pete Flint
 The Yellow Canary (1963) as Ed Thornburg
 It's a Mad, Mad, Mad, Mad World (1963) as Radio tower operator at Rancho Conejo
 Looking for Love (1964) as Tiger Shay
 A House is Not a Home (1964) as Rafferty
 Pajama Party (1964) as J. Sinister Hulk
 Dear Brigitte (1965) as Cliff Argyle - the Bookie
 The Ghost in the Invisible Bikini (1966) as J. Sinister Hulk
 The Reluctant Astronaut (1967) as Donelli
 The Spirit Is Willing (1967) as Fess Dorple
 Togetherness (1970) as Henry
 Bless the Beasts and the Children (1971) as Sid Shecker
 The Brothers O'Toole (1973) as the Mayor
 Las Vegas Lady (1975) as Big Jake
 Return to Campus (1975) as Sports announcer
 Nashville Girl (1976) as C.Y. Ordell
 Won Ton Ton, the Dog Who Saved Hollywood (1976) as Rudy's Agent
 The Cat from Outer Space (1978) as Earnest Ernie
 Monster in the Closet (1986) as Ben
 Matinee (1993) as Mr. Spector

Television

 Make Room for Daddy (1 episode, 1954)
 The Loretta Young Show (1 episode, 1954)
 Dear Phoebe (1 episode, 1954) as Murray Kragon
 Treasury Men in Action (1 episode, 1955) as Ronald Terni
 Lux Video Theatre (1 episode, 1955) as Sigmund
 The Lone Ranger (1 episode, 1955) as Col. Willoughby J. Oglethorpe
 Jane Wyman Presents The Fireside Theatre (1 episode, 1955) as Al
 TV Reader's Digest (1 episode, 1955)
 Four Star Playhouse (1 episode, 1955) as Mr. Simpson
 Damon Runyon Theater (1 episode, 1955) as Chesty Charlie
 Cavalcade of America (1 episode, 1956)
 Private Secretary (5 episodes, 1954–56) as Mickey Calhoun / 'Cagey' Calhoun / Mickey 'Cagey' Calhoun
 Climax! (1 episode, 1957) as Philly
 The 20th Century Fox Hour (4 episodes, 1956–57) as Doberman / George / George Kirby / Eddie Hoke
 Circus Boy (1 episode, 1957) as Spike Marlin
 Mr. Adams and Eve (1 episode, 1958) as Director
 The Bob Cummings Show (1 episode, 1958) as H.R. Hap Henderson
 The Real McCoys (1 episode, 1958) as San Fernando Harry
 Westinghouse Desilu Playhouse (2 episodes, 1958) as Bartender / Barney Snyder
 The Thin Man (1 episode, 1959) as Nitro Noonan
 The Donna Reed Show (1 episode, 1959) as Vance
 The Texan (1 episode, 1959) as Sheriff Weeb Martin
 Lux Playhouse (1 episode, 1959) as Detective Drake
 Richard Diamond, Private Detective (1 episode, 1959) as Walt Conlin
 The David Niven Show (1 episode, 1959) as Paul Reisner
 Alcoa Theatre (1 episode, 1959) as John Burke
 Tightrope (2 episodes, 1959–60) as Pete Granger / Mike Davis
 Man with a Camera (1960) as Frankie Billings
 The Best of the Post (1 episode, 1961) as Benny
 The Andy Griffith Show (1 episode, 1961) as Fred Boone
 Westinghouse Playhouse (2 episodes, 1961) as Fred Sanford
 The Ann Sothern Show (6 episodes, 1960–61) as Oscar Pudney / Simpson
 Angel (1 episode, in "Promise to a Friend", 1961) as Max
 The Dick Van Dyke Show (1 episode, 1961) as Bill
 General Electric Theater (3 episodes, 1954–61) as Mike / Joe Maskowitz
 The Roaring 20s (1 episode, 1961) as Boots
 77 Sunset Strip (1 episode, 1961) as Marvin Heywood
 Calvin and the Colonel (1 episode, 1961) as Sgt. Thomas (voice)
 The Twilight Zone (2 episodes, 1961–1962) as Harmon Cavender / Repair Man
 Ichabod and Me (2 episodes, 1962) as Lippy Bourke
 King of Diamonds (1 episode, 1962) as Sig Norge
 Pete and Gladys (1 episode, 1962) as Martin
 Adventures in Paradise (1 episode, 1962) as Frank Crayle
 Cain's Hundred (1 episode, 1962) as Rudy
 Oh! Those Bells (1 episode, 1962) as Ankles
 Naked City (1 episode, 1962) as Harold Slate
 I'm Dickens, He's Fenster (1 episode, 1963) as Hershey
 Bob Hope Presents the Chrysler Theatre (1 episode, 1963) as Marvin
 The Jack Benny Program (4 episodes, 1957–64) as Steve Burke / Talent Agent Weber / Mr. Weber
 Ben Casey (1 episode, 1964) as Mr. Barringer
 Bonanza (Episode: "The Saga of Muley Jones", 1964) as Eskey
 Linus! The Lion Hearted (2 episodes, 1964) as Claudius Crow (voice)
 Jonny Quest (1 episode, 1964) as Pasha Peddler (voice)
 Mickey (1 episode, 1964) as Sid
 The Addams Family (1 episode, 1964) as Sgt. Haley
 Kraft Suspense Theatre (1 episode, 1965) as Emil Glueck
 The Munsters (1 episode, 1965) as J. R. Finlater
 Perry Mason (5 episodes, 1958–65) as Max Armstead / Tony Cerro / Burt Renshaw / Cecil / Luke Hickey
 The Wild Wild West (1 episode, 1966) as Governor Lewis
 Please Don't Eat the Daisies (1 episode, 1966)
 The Tammy Grimes Show (1 episode, 1966) as Gus
 Green Acres (2 episodes, 1965–67) as Charlie / George Wilkins
 Gomer Pyle, U.S.M.C. (1 episode, 1967–1968) as Harry Krasna / The Owner
 The Beverly Hillbillies (2 episodes, 1963–67) as Mr. Mortimer / H.H.H. Jones
 Rango (1 episode, 1967) as Gus
 I Dream of Jeannie (1 episode, 1967) as Sam
 Accidental Family (1 episode, 1967) as Mr. Fenton
 Hawaii Five-O (1 episode, 1968–69) as Nat Keller
 That Girl (5 episodes, 1969) as Eddy Edwards / Hal Grissom / Phil Bender / Clinton Hayworth
 The Jackie Gleason Show (2 episodes, 1967–69) as 'Swifty' Jenkins / Bob Cosgrove
 Land of the Giants (1 episode, 1969) as Max Manfred
 The Debbie Reynolds Show (1 episode, 1970) as Mayor Keiselbach
 Dad, Can I Borrow the Car? (1970)
 Mannix (1 episode, 1971) as Sam Westlake
 Love, American Style (2 episodes, 1969–71) as Bailiff (segment "Love and the Jury") / Pun Jab (segment "Love and the Divorce Sale")
 The Wonderful World of Disney (1 episode, 1972)
 Here's Lucy (1 episode, 1972) as Hickey
 Of Thee I Sing (1972) as Matthew Fulton
 Harvey (Hallmark Hall of Fame, re-enacting his role in the 1950 film, 1972), as Marvin Wilson
 These Are the Days (unknown episodes, 1974–75) (voice)
 Devlin (unknown episodes, 1974) (voice)
 Kolchak: The Night Stalker (1 episode, 1975) as Security Guard
 Happy Days (1 episode, 1975) as Bander
 New Zoo Revue (2 episodes, 1975) as Professor Gordon / Mr. Bigwig
 Quincy, M.E. (1 episode, 1977) as Mechanic
 ABC Weekend Special (1 episode, 1977) as Mr. Gabby
 Alien Worlds (1 episode, 1979) (voice)
 The Love Boat (1 episode, 1981) as Harry
 Hart to Hart (1 episode, 1982) as Ernie
 Pandamonium (1982–83) as Chesty (voice)
 Trapper John, M.D. (1 episode, 1983) as Mac Mulligan
 Inspector Gadget (pilot episode, 1982, unreleased version) as Inspector Gadget (voice)
 Small Wonder (1 episode, 1987)
 The New Gidget (1 episode, 1987) as Washing Machine Repairman
 Garfield and Friends (1 episode, 1989) as Howie (voice)
 MacGyver (1 episode, 1990) as Mel
 Seinfeld (1 episode, 1996) as Ralph (final appearance)

Commercials
Maytag (1967–1988) as Ol' Lonely the repairman

Theatre
 Sons and Soldiers (1943) as The Salesman
 My Dear Public (1943) as Gus Wagner
 Mrs. Kimball Presents (1944) as J. G. McGuire
 Helen Goes To Troy (1944) as Ajax 1st
 Harvey (1943) as Duane Wilson
 Born Yesterday (1946) as Harry Brock
 The Cradle Will Rock (1947) as Dick
 Red Gloves (1948) as Marochek
 Kelly (1965) as Stickpin Sidney Crane
 The Front Page (1969) as The Mayor
 Harvey (1970) as Duane Wilson

Notes

References

External links

 
 
 
 A writeup about the Maytag Repairman, with photo

1917 births
1997 deaths
Male actors from Buffalo, New York
American male film actors
American male stage actors
American male television actors
American male voice actors
Male actors from Akron, Ohio
Male actors from Cleveland
Male actors from Los Angeles
Burials at Mount Sinai Memorial Park Cemetery
20th-century American male actors
Jewish American male actors
20th-century American comedians
Comedians from California
20th-century American Jews